Oscar Finch (October 28, 1827 – March 25, 1913) was an American miller and politician.

Born in Windham, Greene County, New York, Finch moved to Sauk County, Wisconsin in 1868. In 1880, Finch moved to Augusta, Wisconsin. He was a miller. In 1887, 1888, and 1889, Finch was mayor of Augusta and was a Democrat. In 1891, Finch served in the Wisconsin State Assembly. Finch died at his home in Augusta, Wisconsin.

Notes

1827 births
1913 deaths
People from Greene County, New York
People from Augusta, Wisconsin
Businesspeople from Wisconsin
Millers
Mayors of places in Wisconsin
19th-century American politicians
People from Sauk County, Wisconsin
19th-century American businesspeople
Democratic Party members of the Wisconsin State Assembly